The Carlos Palanca Memorial Awards for Literature winners in the year 1988 (rank, title of winning entry, name of author).


English division
Short story
First prize: “Our Lady of the Arts and Letters” by Eli Ang Barroso
Second prize: “Antonio and His China Wall” by Mario Miclat
Third prize: “Mourning and Weeping in this Valley of Tears” by Eric Gamalinda; and “The Perpetual Monday Morning in the Life of Jose Sakay” by Nowell Danao

Poetry
First prize: “Poems for Amina” by Merlie Alunan
Second prize: “Patria Y Muerte” by Eric Gamalinda; “Secret of Graphite” by Ramon Sunico; and “Star Maps and Other Poems” by Edgardo B. Maranan
Third prize: “Horns of the World” by Clovis Nazareno; “Nude” by Benilda S. Santos; and “Poems for Three Friends” by Elson Elizaga

Essay
First prize: “A Sort of Life by the Seawall” by Tezza Parel
Second prize: “Deconstructing America: America Through the Eyes of Filipinos” by Isagani R. Cruz
Third prize: “Palawan: Tales of Poverty, Poetry and Time Travel” by Edgardo B. Maranan

One-act play
First prize: “Salcedo” by Bobby Flores Villasis
Second prize: No winner
Third prize: “Japayukisan” by Elsa Martinez Coscolluela

Full-length play
First prize: No winner
Second prize: No winner
Third prize: “Alin Ed Purona or Princess Urduja” by Mig Alvarez Enriquez
Special mention “The Wedding” by Felix A. Clemente; and “Ulahingan Rud-suan” by Leoncio P. Deriada

Filipino division
Short story
First prize: “Sugat sa Dagat” by Cyrus P. Borja
Second prize: “Ecce Homo, Ecce Machina” by Dong Delos Reyes
Third prize: “Huling Pagsusulit” by Ronald De Leon; and “Sino Man sa Atin” by Rosario Balmaceda-Gutierrez

Poetry
First prize: “Malulungkot na Taludtod” by Ariel Dim. Borlongan
Second prize: “Babae Akong Namumuhay Mag-isa” by Josephine Barrios
Third prize: “Mga Pangarap at Bangungot na Di Malimot” by Romulo P. Baquiran Jr.; and “Sa Pakpak ng Balse ni Strauss” by Benilda S. Santos

Essay
Special mention
“Ang Filipino sa Larangan ng Panitikan” by Isagani R. Cruz
“Ang Mga Badjao sa Tungkalan” by Tomas F. Agulto
“Sa Malalim at Malayong Panahon...” by Pedro L. Ricarte
“Talinhaga, Hinaing at Pag-ibig ng Isang Makata” by Rustica Carpio

One-act play
First prize: “Ang Bagong Libis ng Nayon” by Ronaldo C. Tumbokon; and “Tumbampreso” by Manuel R. Buising
Second prize: “Abril 1521” by Amado Lacuesta Jr.; and “Kuwerdas” by Catherine Calzo
Third prize: No winner

Full-length play
First prize: “Kung Bakit May Nuno sa Punso” by Manuel R. Buising
Second prize: “Pulitika ng Buhay at Pag-ibig” by Malou Leviste Jacob
Third prize: “Larawan ng Pilipino Bilang Artista” by Felix Padilla

References
 

Palanca Awards
Palanca Awards, 1988